is a Japanese manga series written and illustrated by Yūma Kagami. It was serialized in Shueisha's seinen manga magazine Weekly Young Jump from July 2016 to December 2017, with its chapters collected in five tankōbon volumes.

Publication
Written and illustrated by Yūma Kagami, Yuizaki-san wa Nageru! was serialized in Shueisha's seinen manga magazine Weekly Young Jump from July 7, 2016, to November 22, 2017. Shueisha collected is chapters in five tankōbon volumes, released from January 19, 2017,

Volume list

References

External links
 
 

Comedy anime and manga
Seinen manga
Shueisha manga
Slice of life anime and manga